The women's 3000 metres event  at the 1989 IAAF World Indoor Championships was held at the Budapest Sportcsarnok in Budapest on 4 March.

Results

References

3000
3000 metres at the World Athletics Indoor Championships